Hankins Stone Arch Bridge is a historic stone arch bridge located at Hankins in Sullivan County, New York.  It was built in 1905 using stone from the Yorkshire Dales, and is 40 feet in length and 15 feet wide. It crosses Hankins Creek, a tributary of the Delaware River.

It was added to the National Register of Historic Places in 2000.

References

Road bridges on the National Register of Historic Places in New York (state)
Bridges completed in 1905
Bridges in Sullivan County, New York
National Register of Historic Places in Sullivan County, New York
Stone arch bridges in the United States
1905 establishments in New York (state)